is a Japanese anime television series. It began airing in October 2015 and has been licensed in North America by Funimation. A manga began serialization in GFantasy in September 2015.

Plot
Ritsuka Tachibana, a seemingly normal schoolgirl, suddenly finds herself become entangled in a conflict between devils and vampires at her school, with both sides believing she is the last remaining key to discovering the location of the forbidden grimoire, a powerful item that will give mastery over the world to whichever side obtains it first.

Characters

A sixteen year old second-year student of Shikō Academy. She lived with her mother in Shikō Town before Jek ransacked their house and kidnapped her mother. She is, in fact, the forbidden grimoire, leading the demons and vampires into a competition to obtain her. She wears a pendant containing potpourri given to her by her mother, which was intended to mask the scent of the grimoire.

A high-ranking devil and the head of the academy's student council. He is the heir of the Arlond family. At first, he only sees Ritsuka as a 'pawn' in order to find out the location of the grimoire, but over time, he starts to care for her. In episode eight, it is implied that he has developed feelings for Ritsuka.

Ritsuka's cousin, born a year before her. His real mother, Marta Tachibana died when he was young, and Maria Tachibana raised him and her daughter, Ritsuka as siblings since then. After being charged by their grandfather to protect the Tachibana family, he traveled to England to become an exorcist, returning after their mother's kidnapping and enrolling at Shikō Academy. He is very protective of Ritsuka, due to his feelings for her that go beyond family affection. When he is enraged, especially regarding someone threatening Ritsuka, his eyes will turn red and his fingernails transform into claws. In episode nine, it is revealed that he is a dhamphir, half-human, half-vampire.

A womanizing devil (incubus) who serves as the vice-president of the student council. While he is not equal to Rem in status, they are closely matched in power.

An athletic and self-confident devil who serves as the student council's secretary.

A sadistic fallen angel who serves as treasurer for the student council.

Ritsuka's mother. She was kidnapped by Jek at the beginning of the series.

Ritsuka's best friend at school. She cares for Ritsuka and is always worried when her friend gets caught up with the Student Council whom she doesn't trust nor like. In episode six, she is revealed to be an exorcist. She is killed by Jek in episode eight.

Rem's pet Pomeranian. He is terrified of Shiki due to the latter's tendency to torment him. It is revealed in episode seven that he is in fact Cerberus, the same as the mysterious person who can pass in and out of the third library freely, and is the servant of Lord Maksis; he wishes to procure the grimoire to help his master's fading strength.

A vampire who is searching for the prohibited grimoire. He has an army of minions under his control. He is in the service of an entity named Nesta.

The king of the vampires. He is searching for the grimoire, hoping to use it to overthrow the devils. Jek is one of his many servants. He is Lindo's father, having seduced Marta in an attempt to get near the grimoire.

Ritsuka's deceased maternal aunt and Lindo's mother. She died before the events of the series.

A devil king and Ritsuka's father. His servant, Loewen, is searching for the grimoire so that he may regain his lost power.

Media

Anime
The anime television series is produced as a collaboration between video game developer company Rejet, music studio Elements Garden, and music company Avex. The series will be directed by Ai Yoshimura, with the animation studio Brain's Base producing the animation. The series is written by Tomoko Konparu, based on a concept by Daisuke Iwasaki and Grimoire Henshūshitsu. Hirotaka Maeda and Yuka Takashina provide the series character designs. Junpei Fujita and DIVE II Entertainment produce the series' music, which is composed by Elements Garden. It aired on Tokyo MX, Sun TV, and BS Fuji starting on 7 October 2015. Funimation licensed the series for release and simulcast in North America. Funimation also offered a "broadcast dub" for the series, starting on 11 November 2015.

An anime theatrical film was announced at a Dance with Devils concert event on 29 January 2017, titled Dance with Devils: Fortuna. It was released on 4 November 2017, with the staff and cast from the anime series returning to reprise their roles in the film.

Episode list

Manga
An original manga, written and illustrated by Samako Natsu and titled Dance with Devils -Blight-, began publishing in Square Enix's shōnen magazine GFantasy on 18 September 2015. Rika Nakase will collaborate on the story.

Volumes

Stage plays
A series of 2.5D musical stage plays began in 2016. The visuals reveals Daiki Ise as Jek, Kōhei Norizuki as Noel, Ryūjirō Izaki as Holland (double-cast with Subaru Kimura). The previously announced cast includes Keisuke Kaminaga as Rem Kaginuki, Jin Hiramaki as Lindo Tachibana, Tsubasa Sakiyama as Urie Sogami, Yū Yoshioka as Mage Nanashiro, Junpei Yasukawa as Shiki Natsumezaka, and Taiki Naitō as Loewen. Kaori Miuchi began to direct the musical and writing the script. The play will have 14 performances between March 3–13, 2016 in Tokyo. The second musical plays were started at December 21–27, 2016 and the third stage plays were started on March 15–25, 2018.

Video game
Rejet released a Dance with Devils game for PlayStation Vita on 24 March 2016. The theme song, composed by Elements Garden, is performed by Wataru Hatano.

References

External links
  
  at Rejet 
  at Square Enix 
 

Brain's Base
Anime with original screenplays
Funimation
Gangan Comics manga
Male harem anime and manga
Manga based on video games
Music in anime and manga
Romance anime and manga
Tokyo MX original programming
Vampires in anime and manga
2017 anime films